Richard Eden (born 1956) is a Canadian actor, screenwriter, and producer. He is best known as Alex Murphy / RoboCop in the television series RoboCop: The Series and has enjoyed a prolific career on stage, television, and in independent films. Richard has received multiple awards and was nominated for a Daytime Emmy in 1987 for his role as Brick Wallace on Santa Barbara. He and his wife, Shannon, currently create projects for television and film.

References

External links
 

1956 births
Living people
Canadian male television actors
Canadian male film actors
Canadian male voice actors
Male actors from Toronto